Parque Carrasco is a residential neighbourhood and resort of Ciudad de la Costa in Canelones, Uruguay.

Geography
This resort is located near Montevideo, on the Río de la Plata coast. It became part of Ciudad de la Costa on 19 October 1994, upon foundation of the city.

Population
In 2011 Parque Carrasco had a population of 8,628.

Source: Instituto Nacional de Estadística de Uruguay

Street map

References

External links
INE map of Colonia Nicolich, Paso Carrasco, Carrasco Int.Airport, and parts of the municipality of Ciudad de la Costa (incl. Parque Carrasco)

Ciudad de la Costa